Patrick Scanlan (1838 – September 5, 1903) was an Irish-born soldier who fought for the Union Army during the American Civil War. He received the Medal of Honor for valor.

Biography
Scanlan received the Medal of Honor in January 21, 1897 for his actions at Ashepoo River, South Carolina on May 24, 1864 while with Company A of the 4th Massachusetts Volunteer Cavalry Regiment.

Medal of Honor citation

Citation:

The President of the United States of America, in the name of Congress, takes pleasure in presenting the Medal of Honor to Private Patrick Scanlan, United States Army, for extraordinary heroism on 24 May 1864, while serving with Company A, 4th Massachusetts Cavalry, in action at Ashepoo River, South Carolina. Private Scanlan volunteered as a member of a boat crew which went to the rescue of a large number of Union soldiers on board the stranded steamer Boston, and with great gallantry assisted in conveying them to shore, being exposed during the entire time to a heavy fire from a Confederate battery."

See also

List of American Civil War Medal of Honor recipients: Q–S

References

External links

1838 births
1903 deaths
Union Army soldiers
United States Army Medal of Honor recipients
American Civil War recipients of the Medal of Honor
Irish-born Medal of Honor recipients
Irish emigrants to the United States (before 1923)